The Bielsko-Biała Power Plant is a complex of coal-fired combined heat and power plants at Czechowice-Dziedzice near Bielsko-Biała, Poland. The complex is operated by Południowy Koncern Energetyczny, a subsidiary of the Tauron Group.

History 
The first plant (EC1) at Bielsko Biala was built in 1960–1973. The necessity of building this power station was caused when Bielsko and Czechowice formed a big industrial center which required more energy. The second power plant (EC2) was built in 1975–1997 to supply energy for the Fabryka Samochodów Małolitrażowych car factory and residential housing estates.  In 2009, it was announced that Tauron Groupis planning to build a new generation unit with power capacity of 50 MW and thermal capacity of 150 MWt.

Specifications 
The first plant has four boilers and consists of three turbine sets. It has installed power capacity of 77 MW and installed thermal capacity of 275 MJ/s.  The second plant has a heating unit with the circulating fluidized bed boiler and two heating steam-oil boilers. It has installed power capacity of 55 MW and installed thermal capacity of 172 MJ/s.

References

Energy infrastructure completed in 1973
Energy infrastructure completed in 1997
Coal-fired power stations in Poland
Cogeneration power stations in Poland
Buildings and structures in Bielsko-Biała
Cieszyn Silesia